Pavel Aleksandrovich Krushevan ( – ) was a journalist, editor, publisher and an official in Imperial Russia. He was an active Black Hundredist and known for his far-right, ultra-nationalist and openly antisemitic views. He was the first publisher of The Protocols of the Elders of Zion.

Biography
Born Pavolaki Krushevan into a family of impoverished Russianized Moldavian aristocrats in the village of Gindeshty, Soroksky, in the Bessarabia Governorate of the Russian Empire (now Ghindești, Florești, Moldova), where he completed four grades of school. Krushevan's half-sister Sarah Borenstein (born Anastasia Krushevan) was a "pious Jewish woman" who had converted to Judaism. Sarah was married to Chaim Borenstein, the son of a shohet. Sarah alleged that her brother and her parents "beat her and threatened to drive her from their home" after they discovered her relationship with Chaim. Krushevan's newspaper published daily attacks on Sarah and Chaim, accusing the Jewish community of kidnapping Sarah, and offered a financial reward to anyone who could track down his sister "dead or alive." Sarah and Chaim fled Russia due to the threats, settling in Baltimore, Maryland.

Krushevan served as a clerk in Kishinev (now Chișinău) City Duma. His writings were first published in 1882. From 1887 to 1896, he worked as a journalist at the newspapers Minsky Listok ("The Minsk Post"), Vilensky Vestnik ("The Vilna News"), and Bessarabsky Vestnik ("The Bessarabia News").

During the decade that followed, Krushevan founded and served as a publisher and editor of several newspapers:
 In 1897, a Chișinău daily newspaper Bessarabets ("The Bessarabian") which published materials fomenting anti-Semitism. Krushevan was reported as being one of the initiators of the Kishinev pogrom in April 1903.
 In 1903, Saint Petersburg daily newspaper Znamya, where the first (abridged) edition of The Protocols of the Elders of Zion was published in series from 28 August to 7 September O.S. 1903.
 In 1906, Kishinev newspaper Drug ("The Friend").

Krushevan promoted ultra-nationalist and racist views and was brought to court numerous times for slander, verbal offenses and physical threats. After a homicide attempt by a Pinkhus Dashevsky, it was reported that Krushevan lived in constant fear, kept weapons close at hand and was accompanied by a personal cook out of fear to be poisoned.

In 1903 a riot started after an incident on 6 February when a Christian Russian boy, Mikhail Rybachenko, was found murdered in the town of Dubossary (now Dubăsari), about 25 miles north of Kishinev. Although it was clear that the boy had been killed by a relative (who was later found), Krushevan's Bessarabets insinuated that he was killed by the Jews, which instigated the Kishinev pogrom.

In 1905 Krushevan organized the Bessarabian Patriotic League. He founded the Bessarabian branch of the Union of the Russian People.

From 1906 to 1909 he served as a speaker of Kishinev city in the Duma. In 1907 Krushevan was elected to represent Kishinev in the 2nd Russian State Duma.

See also 
 History of the Jews in Bessarabia
 History of the Jews in Russia and the Soviet Union

References

External links 
 Rosenthal, Herman and Rosenthal, Max, "Kishinef (Kishinev)", in the Jewish Encyclopedia (1901–1906)
 Century of Hatred: 'Protocols' Live To Poison Yet Another Generation
 Davitt, Michael, "Within the Pale"
 Urussof, Prince Serge Dmitriyevich "Memoirs of a Russian Governor"

1860 births
1909 deaths
People from Florești District
People from Soroksky Uyezd
Members of the Union of the Russian People
Members of the 2nd State Duma of the Russian Empire
Politicians of the Bessarabia Governorate
Russian conspiracy theorists
Russian journalists
Moldovan journalists
Male journalists
Moldovan newspaper editors
Moldovan newspaper founders
Moldovan conspiracy theorists
Protocols of the Elders of Zion
Antisemitism in the Russian Empire
Kishinev pogrom